Waverly Township is an inactive township located in Lincoln County, in the U.S. state of Missouri.

It was established in 1825.

References

Townships in Missouri
Townships in Lincoln County, Missouri
1825 establishments in Missouri